Chung Fat is a Hong Kong-based actor, choreographer, producer, and director. He primarily stars in jiangshi fictions and martial art movies.

Early life 
Chung was born on 2nd December, 1953. He is a native of Guangdong province and of Han ethnicity. As a teenager, he was a Northern Praying Mantis practitioner with Lam Ching-ying, under Madame Fok's guidance. He became proficient in the use of a great variety of martial arts weapons and techniques.

He was trained by Madame Fan Kuk-fa of The Spring and Autumn Drama School.

Performing experience
Chung Fat debuted early on the silver screen, shooting Enter the Dragon (1973) with Bruce Lee. Chung stated, "You need thousands of extras, some of which must be at the pinnacle of martial arts, Lam Ching-ying was the fellow with the opportunity when they were hiring extras". Chung Fat had a small role as a security guard who fails to capture Lee, (Bruce Lee) when he investigates the island. In the film, Han (Kien Shih) is described to order Bolo, (Bolo Yeung) to kill him along with several of his colleagues for failing at their task.

With this opportunity, he entered the movies circle, being at the front line for more than 30 years, in addition to his jiangshi-themed films. Chung only had three protagonist roles in his career, instead often being cast in supporting, secondary or mainly villain roles. He also has worked as a director, choreographer, and planner.

He had a long-term collaboration with Jackie Chan and Sammo Hung. In the 21st Century his film appearances had mostly faded out, making mainly commercials. However, in 2013 he was invited back to the silver screen by Juno Mak to film his new jiangshi film, "Rigor Mortis" and help to fight off those new vampire-zombies.

Selected filmography

Men Like These (1932)
Chinese Hercules (1973)
Enter the Dragon (USA, 1973) as Han traitor (uncredited)
Tie han rou qing (1974)
Yi shan wu hu (1974)
The Tournament (1974)
The Shaolin Plot (1977)
The Iron-Fisted Monk (1977) as Shu-Liu Worker
Last Strike (1977)
He Has Nothing But Kung Fu (1977) as Wang's man
Bruce Li - The Invincible (1978, cameo)
Enter the Fat Dragon (1978, cameo) as Fighter in Opening Credit Sequence
Bian fu chuan qi (1978)
Shui yue men (1978)
The Game of Death (1978)
Warriors Two (1978) as Tramp
Dirty Tiger, Crazy Frog (1978) as Chicken's Brother #1
The Incredible Kung Fu Master (1979) as Little Dog
Da chu tou (1979)
Knockabout (1979) as Vegetable hawker / Big Eyes
Lao shu la gui (1979)
Odd Couple (1979, cameo) as Ti
His Name is Nobody (1979) as Ping the Dreg
Crazy Partner (1979)
The Magnificent Butcher (1979) as Wildcat
Way of the Black Dragon (1979)
Death Duel of Kung Fu (1979)
The Victim (1980, cameo) as Choy Fan-Tan
By Hook or by Crook (1980) as Chung Fa-Pai / Golden Killer
Two Toothless Tigers (1980)
Encounters of the Spooky Kind (1980) as Priest Tsui
Two Fists Against the Law (1980)
The Phantom Killer (1981)
The Prodigal Son (1981) as Mr Law
To Hell with the Devil (1982, cameo) as The Devil
The Dead and the Deadly (1982) as The Priest
Zu Warriors from the Magic Mountain (1983) as Blue Commander
The Trail (1983, also action) as Flint
Winners and Sinners (1983) as Tar's Top Henchman
Pom Pom (1984) as Columbo
The Return of Pom Pom (1984) as Sherlock Holmes
Mr. Boo Meets Pom Pom (1985)
Those Merry Souls (1985) as Messenger of Death
Twinkle Twinkle Lucky Stars (1985) as Moustached Assassin
Heart of Dragon (1985) as Moose / Cho Yee Fat
Yes, Madam (1985) as Mad-dog
The Millionaire's Express (1986) as Mountain Bandit
New Mr. Vampire (1986) as Master Chin
Rosa (1986) as Assassin
Mr. Vampire II (1986) as Professor Kwok
Magic Crystal (1986) as Triad Boss' Thug
Righting Wrongs (1986, cameo) as Red Porsche Cop
Eastern Condors (1987) as Col Young's commando #3
The Haunted Cop Shop (1987) as Chung Fat Pak
Shy Spirit (1988) as Wang
Dragons Forever (1988) as Ship Thug (uncredited)
Chaos by Design (1988)
Miss Magic (1988) as Uncle Fok
Three Against the World (1988) as Gambler on train
Spooky, Spooky (1988) as Chen Ta-Wen / Queency
18 Times (1988)
Geung see suk suk (1988) as Taoist Crane
Pedicab Driver (1989) as Thug
The Blonde Fury (1989) as Break-and-Enter Thief
Ghost Busting (1989) as Master Cheung Kwok Wing
Fu gui bing tuan (1990) as Japanese Officer
The Spooky Family (1990) as Wizard
Stage Door Johnny (1990)
She Shoots Straight (1990) as Hua, the Boss
My Neighbours are Phantoms (1990) as George Chan
The Revenge of Angel (1990) as Chan Ping
Pantyhose Hero (1990) as Chainsaw Robber
Mortuary Blues (1990)
The Gambling Ghost (1991) as Leung's Partner in Flashback
Bo Hao (1991) as Cham
Spiritual Trinity (1991) as Wizard
Nu gui sheng si lian (1991) as Wu Tien
Liu Jai Home for the Intimate Ghosts (1991) as High Priest
Ghost Killer (1992)
Cai guo jie huang jin bu dui (1992)
Pretty Ghostress Story (1992)
Beauty Investigator (1992) as Chung Fat
Du ming xi yang (1992)
Behind The Curtain (1992)
Shadow Cop (1993) as Fat
Last Hero in China (1993) as Yuen Long
Crime Story (1993) as Ng Kwok-Wah / Wu Kuo Hua
The 13 Cold-Blooded Eagles (1993) as Xingshu Laoying
Xue qiang lei ying (1993)
Miao jie shi san mei (1993) as Wang Pan
Ghost's Love (1993) as Ng
Deadful Melody (1994) as Hon Suen
The Lady Punisher (1994)
The Hunted Hunter (1997)
Leopard Hunting (1998) as Chong
Faces of Horror (1998)
Lang dao jiang hu (1999)
White Storm (2000, producer)
Sworn Revenge (2000, producer)
Bloody Secret (2000, producer)
Nothing is Impossible (2006)
Rigor Mortis (2013) as Gau

References

External links
 

1953 births
Living people
Hong Kong male film actors
Hong Kong film directors
Hong Kong film producers
Hong Kong kung fu practitioners
Action choreographers
20th-century Hong Kong male actors
21st-century Hong Kong male actors